KSRB may refer to:

 KSRB-LP, a low-power radio station (100.3 FM) licensed to serve Corpus Christi, Texas, United States
 Upper Cumberland Regional Airport (ICAO code KSRB)